The Grand Forks Chiefs were a minor league baseball team from Grand Forks, North Dakota. They played in the Northern League from 1934 to 1964, with a couple breaks in between.

History
Minor league baseball first began in Grand Forks when the 1897 Grand Forks Senators became members of the Red River Valley League. They were followed by the Grand Forks Forkers who played as members of the  Northern League (1902-1905) and Northern-Copper Country League (1906). The Grand Forks Flickertails played as members of the Central International League (1912) and Northern League (1913-1915).

The Grand Forks Chiefs began play in 1934, after Grand Forks had hosted the two previous teams in the Northern League. The Chiefs were a minor league affiliate of the Los Angeles Dodgers (1964), Cleveland Indians (1963, Pittsburgh Pirates (1956–1962), Philadelphia Phillies (1951–1952), New York Yankees (1948–1950), Brooklyn Dodgers (1946) and Chicago White Sox (1939–1942).

Ballparks

The Chiefs played at home games at the Grand Forks Municipal Ballpark, which was located at 1124 Demers Avenue. Today, the site is the Central Fire Station.

Notable alumni

Baseball Hall of Fame Alumni

 Willie Stargell (1960) Inducted, 1988

Notable alumni

 Bob Clear (1960-1961)
 Dave Garcia (1941)
 Dale Hackbart (1960) Became NFL football player.
 Ramon Hernandez (1959-1960)
 Johnny Hopp (1955) MLB All-Star
 Dick Jamieson (1958) Became NFL player
 Rex Johnston (1960) Played in NFL
 Bob Lee MLB All-Star
 Morrie Martin (1941) 
 Jose Martinez (1961) 
 Gene Michael (1959-1960)
 Johnny Mostil (1938-1939) 2× AL stolen base leader (1925, 1926)
 Glen Selbo (1947) Became NBA  basketball player
 Dave Wickersham (1956)

Year-by-year record

* Baukol Playoffs based on last 30 days of season

References

External links
Baseball Reference

Defunct minor league baseball teams
Sports in Grand Forks, North Dakota
Los Angeles Dodgers minor league affiliates
Brooklyn Dodgers minor league affiliates
Cleveland Guardians minor league affiliates
Chicago White Sox minor league affiliates
Pittsburgh Pirates minor league affiliates
Philadelphia Phillies minor league affiliates
Professional baseball teams in North Dakota
New York Yankees minor league affiliates
Northern League (1902-71) baseball teams
1934 establishments in North Dakota
1964 disestablishments in North Dakota
Baseball teams established in 1934
Baseball teams disestablished in 1964
Defunct baseball teams in North Dakota